Labeobarbus johnstonii is a species of cyprinid fish. It has long been placed in Barbus, the "wastebin genus" for barbs, by default, and this is still being done by the IUCN. However, the species is increasingly being restored to related yellowfish genus Labeobarbus which seems a much more appropriate placement. It is presumably hexaploid like the other yellowfish. The supposed subspecies latirostris of its relative L. intermedius is actually misidentified L. johnstonii.

Its natural habitats are rivers and freshwater lakes. It is found in Lake Malawi, the Shire River and their larger tributaries in Malawi, Mozambique and Tanzania.

Like other yellowfish, L. johnstonii is a large species. This freshwater fish is found in small group in all sorts of underwater habitat. They are omnivores, but adult fish like to eat smaller fishes in particular. For spawning, they migrate towards the rivers' headwaters in the rainy season. The lake populations often do not return from their spawning grounds until the dry season has started.

This species is of commercial significance. It is collected and traded for aquaria, typically when young, but it must be remembered that this is only a fish for the largest of tanks if it shall thrive. The spawning adults are fished for local food and for trade. Although L. johnstonii is widespread and not considered a threatened species by the IUCN, catching the fishes when they migrate to spawn and not when they return as well as the use of fish poisons (which is illegal but still practiced in places) is probably depleting its numbers faster than they can recover.

Footnotes

References
 de Graaf, Martin; Megens, Hendrik-Jan; Samallo, Johannis & Sibbing, Ferdinand A. (2007): Evolutionary origin of Lake Tana's (Ethiopia) small Barbus species: indications of rapid ecological divergence and speciation. Animal Biology 57(1): 39-48.  (HTML abstract)
 

johnstonii
Cyprinid fish of Africa
Freshwater fish of Tanzania
Fish of Mozambique
Fish of Malawi
Fish described in 1907
Taxa named by George Albert Boulenger
Taxonomy articles created by Polbot
Fish of Lake Malawi